Edward Matthew "Doc" Dougherty (born November 4, 1947) is an American professional golfer who has played on the PGA Tour and Champions Tour.

Dougherty was born in Chester, Pennsylvania. He was drafted into the Army after high school and served a tour of duty in Vietnam. Dougherty developed a serious interest in golf while stationed at Fort Lewis, Washington after returning from Southeast Asia. He turned pro in 1969.

Dougherty had 19 top-10 finishes in PGA Tour events during his career including a win at the Deposit Guaranty Golf Classic in 1995, which one year earlier had become an official event. He had more than one million dollars in earnings during the regular years phase of his career.

Dougherty began play on the Senior PGA Tour in the spring of 1998. With over 5.8 million dollars in official earnings after reaching the age of 50, he has enjoyed a far greater degree of success on the elite senior circuit as compared with his regular career. He received the August 2000 Player of the Month award. In 2001, he had a career best ten top-10 finishes. He shares the Champions Tour record for Best driving accuracy in a 54-hole tournament.

Dougherty's personal interests include model trains and classic cars. He maintains residences in Linwood, Pennsylvania and Port St. Lucie, Florida.

Professional wins (8)

PGA Tour wins (1)

PGA Tour playoff record (0–1)

Other wins (5)
1975 Philadelphia PGA Championship
1980 Philadelphia PGA Championship
1983 Philadelphia Open Championship
1985 PGA Club Professional Championship
1986 Philadelphia PGA Championship

Senior PGA Tour wins (2)

Senior PGA Tour playoff record (0–1)

Results in major championships

Note: Dougherty never played in The Open Championship.

CUT = missed the half-way cut
"T" = tied

See also
1986 PGA Tour Qualifying School graduates
1989 PGA Tour Qualifying School graduates

References

External links

Profile on Senior PGA Championship's official site
Biographical information from CBS Sports

American male golfers
PGA Tour golfers
PGA Tour Champions golfers
Golfers from Pennsylvania
Golfers from Florida
United States Army personnel of the Vietnam War
United States Army soldiers
Sportspeople from Chester, Pennsylvania
People from Port St. Lucie, Florida
1947 births
Living people